Dominic Schell is an American soccer player who played professionally Major League Soccer and the USL First Division.

Schell attended the University of Mobile.  In 1999, Schell and his teammates went to the NAIA national men's soccer championship where they finished runner-up to Lindsey Wilson College.  Schell was an NAIA First Team All American that season.

In February 2000, the Columbus Crew selected Schell in the fifth round (57th overall) in the 2000 MLS SuperDraft.  He played seven league and two Open Cup games with the Crew in addition to going on loan to the Cincinnati Riverhawks in June and the MLS Project 40.  Columbus waived Schell in November 2000.  On March 12, 2001, Schell signed with the Nashville Metros.  In 2002, he moved to the El Paso Patriots.  In 2005, he played for the DFW Tornados in the USL Premier Development League.  In 2006, Schell played for the amateur Dallas Roma which upset Chivas USA in the Open Cup.  During the 2008-2009 PASL season, Schell played one game each, scoring one goal a piece, for the Texas Outlaws and the St. Louis Illusion.  In 2009, he played for Lynch's Irish Pub F.C.  In November 2009, he joined the Texas Outlaws of the Premier Arena Soccer League. In October 2018, Schell led the celebrated Friendly FC to the second consecutive championship of the 2018 Tulsa SoktoberFest tournament outscoring fellow Roma alum Matthew Clark in the 5 game event.

References

External links
 
 Texas Soccer Club: Dominic Schell
 PASL: Dominic Schell

Living people
1977 births
American soccer players
Cincinnati Riverhawks players
Columbus Crew players
DFW Tornados players
El Paso Patriots players
Jackson Chargers players
Major League Soccer players
Professional Arena Soccer League players
St. Louis Illusion players
A-League (1995–2004) players
USL League Two players
MLS Pro-40 players
Nashville Metros players
Soccer players from Dallas
Columbus Crew draft picks
Association football midfielders
Association football forwards